Grassy Island Light is a lighthouse located on Grassy Island, Michigan.

Notes

Lighthouses in Michigan
Buildings and structures in Wayne County, Michigan